Mount Ida is an unincorporated community located in the town of Mount Ida in Grant County, Wisconsin, United States. It is located along U.S. Route 18.

Images

Notes

Unincorporated communities in Wisconsin
Unincorporated communities in Grant County, Wisconsin